Locmélar is a commune in the Finistère department of Brittany in north-western France.

Toponymy
From the Breton loc which means hermitage (cf.: Locminé) and Mélar who is a Breton saint.

Population
Inhabitants of Locmélar are called in French Locmélariens.

See also
Communes of the Finistère department
List of the works of the Maître de Thégonnec
Locmélar Parish close
List of the works of the Maître de Plougastel

References

External links

Official website 

Mayors of Finistère Association 

Communes of Finistère